World's View may refer to:
World's View, Nyanga, viewpoint in the Eastern Highlands of Zimbabwe
Malindidzimu, summit in Matobo National Park, Zimbabwe, also known as "World's View"